Hydrangeaceae is a family of flowering plants in the order Cornales, with a wide distribution in Asia and North America, and locally in southeastern Europe.

Description
The genera are characterised by leaves in opposite pairs (rarely whorled or alternate), and regular, bisexual flowers with 4 (rarely 5–12) petals. The fruit is a capsule or berry containing several seeds, the seeds with a fleshy endosperm.

Genera
The following genera are accepted:
 Carpenteria Torr.
 Deutzia Thunb.
 Fendlera Engelm. & A.Gray
 Fendlerella A.Heller
 Hydrangea Gronov. ex L.
 Jamesia Torr. & A.Gray
 Kirengeshoma Yatabe
 Philadelphus L.
 Whipplea Torr.

Phylogeny 
The family Hydrangeaceae has two subfamilies, namely Jamesioideae and Hydrangeoideae. The subfamily Jamesioideae  comprises the genera Jamesia and Fendlera. They are the sister group to the remaining Hydrangeaceae. The subfamily Hydrangeoideae has two tribes: Hydrangeae consists of Hydrangea s.l., and Philadelpheae consists of Philadelphus, Carpenteria, Deutzia, Kirengeshoma, Whipplea, and Fendlerella. Carpenteria is the sister group to Philadelphus. Deutzia is the sister group to Kirengeshoma, and Fendlerella is the sister group to Whipplea. However the relationships among those three clades within the tribe Philadelphae are a bit unclear. The following cladogram summarizes results from different studies, and for each node it is noted which studies support the sister group positions of the following branches:

References

 
Asterid families